Oxspring is a surname of English origin, possibly derived from Oxspring, a village and civil parish in the Metropolitan Borough of Barnsley in South Yorkshire. People with that name include:

 Arnold Oxspring ( – after 1911), English footballer
 Bobby Oxspring (1919–1989), Royal Air Force officer and flying ace of the Second World War
 Chris Oxspring (born 1977), Australian baseball pitcher and coach

Surnames of English origin